Keah Brown (born September 19, 1991) is a disability rights activist, author, journalist, and writer. She is also known as the creator of the hashtag #DisabledAndCute, which first went viral in February 2017 and caught the attention of such celebrities as Sophia Bush and Brie Larson. Brown has been featured on 3rd Hour of Today to discuss her first published book, The Pretty One: On Life, Pop Culture, Disability, and Other Reasons to Fall in Love, with Me.

Publicity

#DisabledAndCute (campaign) 

Brown “was already an accomplished freelance journalist and writer” when, on February 12, 2017, she created the hashtag #DisabledAndCute in a Twitter post that included "cute" photos of herself, a disabled black woman. Brown then invited members of disabled and non-binary communities to do the same in an act of self-love against the notion that being disabled and being cute (i.e. attractive) are mutually exclusive. #DisabledAndCute went viral within days, catching the attention of celebrities such as Sophia Bush and Brie Larson. With steadily rising popularity as a result, Brown went on to acquire an agent and book deal, which lead to the publishing in August 2019 of her first book, The Pretty One: On Life, Pop Culture, Disability, and Other Reasons to Fall in Love, with Me.

The Pretty One (book) 

Brown's first book, The Pretty One: On Life, Pop Culture, Disability, and Other Reasons to Fall in Love, with Me, published by Atria Publishing Group, is a collection of personal essays/stories in which she relates to popular culture, beauty and body image, romantic love, and physical pain as a black woman with both cerebral palsy (a physical disability) and invisible disabilities. Brown also writes about her relationship with her non-disabled identical twin.

Media appearances 

Brown was featured on 3rd Hour of Today on November 7, 2019, when she was interviewed by Sheinelle Jones and Dylan Dreyer. Earlier in 2019, the New York Times also named Brown as having been chosen by Brie Larson, the lead role in Captain Marvel (film) (2019), to profile Larson for the international magazine, Marie Claire. Handpicking Brown was part of Larsen’s “[vow] to seek out more underrepresented journalists.” Back in September of 216, Amy Poehler's Smart Girls profiled Brown in the article titled "Meet Smart Girl Keah Brown: Brilliant writer and disability activist."

Literary work 

Brown's work has appeared in a number of literary magazines, such as Wildness, an online bimonthly that Poets & Writers Magazine has called one of "Nine New Lit Mags You Need to Read." Poets & Writers reviews Wildness: "Launched in December 2015, Wildness features formally inventive work by both established and emerging writers that embraces the mysteries of the self and the outside world. Issue Five, Tranquility, features new poetry from Cynthia Arrieu-King and Christopher Citro, fiction from Renee Bibby and Wyl Villacres, an essay by Keah Brown, and more."

Brown's writings have covered a range of genres and subjects, from fiction and nonfiction, blogging, interviews, and essays to pieces pertaining to movies and TV, beauty and fashion, sports, and other popular culture, as well as to body positivity and her relationship to body image as a black woman having grown up with cerebral palsy. She has written for Cosmopolitan (magazine), Teen Vogue, Harper’s Bazaar, Refinery29, and Bustle (magazine), among others, as well as online women’s organizations and under-represented communities’ media outlets, such as Essence (magazine), Disability Visibility Project, DIVERSEability, Amy Poehler's Smart Girls, Bitch Magazine, The Establishment, and Gay Mag (a partnership between Roxane Gay and Medium).

Brown contributed an essay for the literary magazine Catapult called "Love, Disability, and Movies," on how “my black disabled body is not the body reflected on screen,” in the romantic comedies and dramas to which she relates.

The rights to Brown's picture book debut, Sam's Super Seats, have been acquired by Sydnee Monday at Kokila. The story, about loving yourself, laughter, and the importance of rest, follows a girl with cerebral palsy who goes back-to-school shopping with her best friends. Sharee Miller (author and illustrator of Don't Touch My Hair!) will be illustrating the book, which is scheduled to be published in the fall of 2020.

Keah’s next book, a debut YA, The Secret Summer Promise, is out June 6th, 2023 via Levine Querido.

Activism 

As a disabled black woman and activist, Brown has been known as a critic of the entertainment industry. In June 2016, Brown wrote the article, "Season Four of ‘Orange Is the New Black’ Has a Race Problem," which would be cited later in the peer-reviewed Canadian Review of American Studies, in 2017.

In September 2016, Amy Poehler's Smart Girls did an interview with Brown that reflected some of Brown's other writings when she said she wanted "to see more women of color with disabilities, specifically black women" acting in lead roles on film and TV.

In February 2017, Brown started the viral campaign, #DisabledAndCute (see above).

In 2018, following the death of Stephen Hawking, Brown was one of multiple activists who "took to social media to protest the portrayal of Hawking in death as 'freeing,' and a meme of him standing, having walked away from his wheelchair, looking up at the stars." Brown had stated that that kind of representation signified "to other disabled people that we should be excited for the opportunity to be 'free' of our bodies, but it also reduces Stephen Hawking, one of the greatest intellectuals ever, to his disability and nothing more."

Brown also questioned in 2018 the entertainment industry’s use of remakes, tweeting: “Instead of rebooting shows, why not try letting black and brown people share our ideas for brand new shows where we exist?”

Bitch Magazine has described Brown as "on a mission to change how disabled people are perceived in pop culture, in fashion, and in our everyday lives."

References

Sources

External links 
 
 

1991 births
Living people
American disability rights activists
Year of birth uncertain
American bloggers
American women bloggers
People with cerebral palsy
21st-century American women